Chrysotoxum elegans is a species of hoverfly. It is found in southern mainland Europe. The larvae are thought to feed on root aphids.

References 

Insects described in 1841
Muscomorph flies of Europe
Syrphinae